Nick Blevins (born 11 November 1988 in Edmonton, Alberta) is a rugby union centre who plays for Prairie Wolf Pack and  Canada.
Blevins made his debut for Canada in 2009 and was part of the Canada squad at the 2015 Rugby World Cup.

References

External links

Living people
Canadian rugby union players
1988 births
Canada international rugby union players
San Francisco Rush players
Prairie Wolf Pack players
Rugby union centres